The Professional Building in Kansas City, Missouri is a building from 1923. It was listed on the National Register of Historic Places in 1982.

References

Office buildings completed in 1929
Buildings and structures in Kansas City, Missouri
Commercial buildings on the National Register of Historic Places in Missouri
National Register of Historic Places in Kansas City, Missouri